Homenetmen Beirut may refer to:

Homenetmen Beirut (basketball), a Lebanese basketball club
Homenetmen Beirut (football), a Lebanese football club

See also
Homenetmen (disambiguation)